was a bi-monthly Japanese shōnen manga magazine, published by Mag Garden that contains manga and information about those series. It began in December 2002, and ceased publication on June 15, 2007, to be revamped as a new magazine called Comic Blade Avarus.

List of serialized titles
01 (Megumi Sumikawa)
Asatte no Houkou (J-ta Yamada)
Archaic Chain
Assassins (Shou Satogane)
Cocoon (Kenjirō Takeshita)
Death God 4 (Shou Satogane)
Dragon Sister! (nini)
Erementar Gerad -Aozora no Senki- (Mayumi Azuma)
Gun Dolls (Kenjirou)
Harukaze Bitter★Bop (Court Betten)
Ignite Wedge (Yoshisada Tsutsumi)
Magica
Maid cafe curio
Monochrome Factor (Kaili Sorano)
Neko Rahmen (Kenji Sonishi)
Omisoreshimashita
Puchi-Hound (nekoneko)
Purism×Egoist
Puzzle+ (Manami Sugano)
Sketchbook (Totan Kobako)
Tactics (Kazuko Higashiyama, art by Sakura Kinoshita)
Uripō (Keitarō Arima)

External links
  Mag Garden's Official Comic Blade Masamune Website

References

2002 establishments in Japan
2007 disestablishments in Japan
Bi-monthly manga magazines published in Japan
Defunct magazines published in Japan
Mag Garden magazines
Magazines established in 2002
Magazines disestablished in 2007
Magazines published in Tokyo
Shōnen manga magazines